The Suffolk County Air Force Base Missile Annex (SAGE codename "BED") is a Formerly Used Defense Site (NY29799F12240/C02NY0714) on Long Island that was a CIM-10 Bomarc missile complex during the Cold War,  west of Suffolk County Air Force Base.   Planned in 1955 for completion in February 1960 and activated as the 2nd operational BOMARC complex on 1 December 1959 (4 missiles by 1 January), the annex was part of  the New York Air Defense Sector defenses. The annex included a Launch Area with 56 Mode II Launcher Shelters in 2 flights (e.g., 2 compressor buildings were available to simultaneously get 2 missiles to the "Standby" stage prior to "Fire-up".)

Missile Support Area
Military police operated from a Security Control and Identification building at the SSW entrance to the annex from Old Country Road. Two flights of missile maintenance airmen used the Assembly and Maintenance (A & M) Shop for preparing newly received missiles, repairing BOMARCs that malfunctioned, and periodic recycling. "Missile Recycle" for 6 mo/2 yr component replacement from "ready-storage" used 5 A & M Shop stations after the missile had been transported to the Main Shop Room following defueling and warhead removal at the Launcher Shelter and decontamination at the Fuel Facility. The A & M Shop with 22 rooms included a "Control Room", and a Telecommunication (TELCO) Room with 2 SAGE Digital Data Receivers and a Digital Data Transmitter for communicating missiles' status to the remote launch control center in New Jersey.

Interceptor Missile Squadron Operations Center
The Interceptor Missile Squadron Operations Center (IMSOC) in the A & M Shop next to the TELCO Room was connected to the "Coaxial Distribution System" for communicating with Electrical Launching Equipment (ELE) in each Launcher Shelter's equipment room. The IMSOC used the "Prelaunch Command System" with a Squadron Supervisor's Station in the IMSOC that included "a desk-type console" with manual controls for acknowledging SAGE "alert orders and other commands". The console controlled missile warm-up (e.g., 2 minutes for IM-99A rocket fuel while 30 seconds was needed for IM-99B: arming of the igniter & activation of gyros, seeker, fuze, etc.) and to maintain the BOMARC at "Standby" (warmed-up & erected) until "Fire-up" by a remote Senior Director's keyed console (fire button) at the launch control center (Weapons Director room) at McGuire DC-01, which also was the launch control center for the missile complex on Fort Dix. The console then displayed whether the missile transitioned to the "Launch" or "Malfunction" stage, which determined the subsequent squadron operation needed at the Launcher Shelter (checkout of the empty shelter or deactivation of the faulty missile).

Civilian use

In 2009 the  former missile launch complex was being used as a county impound lot and county/FBI shooting range.

References

Installations of the United States Air Force in New York (state)
Buildings and structures in Suffolk County, New York
Formerly Used Defense Sites
Long Island
Southampton (town), New York
Surface-to-air missile batteries of the United States
Military installations established in 1960
Military installations closed in 1964
1960 establishments in New York (state)
1964 disestablishments in New York (state)